Condylostylus sipho is a species of fly in the family Dolichopodidae ("longlegged flies"). It is found in North America.

References

Further reading

External links
Diptera.info

Sciapodinae
Diptera of North America
Taxa named by Thomas Say
Insects described in 1823